Dermot O Daly, was a Gaelic-Irish landlord, ancestor of Baron Dunsandle and Clanconal,  fl. 1574 – 10 November 1614.

Background
Dermot was the son of Teige, son of John O Daly, who built Killimor keep during the reign of Henry VIII. Nothing more is known for certain of his ancestry. Pedigrees considered dubious by recent historians claim his descent from the bardic Ó Dálaigh.

James Noel Dillion speculates that "Dermot O’Daly was a chancer, whose rapid advancement was due to the success of the Presidency of Connaught and his ability to turn opportunity to advantage. … he was an ardent crown supporter and the supposed stability which would accrue as a repercussion of adopting English customs and laws."

Active life
He was first recorded in the fiant of 1570, along with others of the name, located at  Laragh in the parish of Killimordaly. He and his family were consistently listed as the Earl of Clanricarde's men. For services to the government, on 21 June 1578 Elizabeth I granted him "the entire Manor or Lordship of Lerra with all the towns and castles belonging". O Daly maintained his own militia, perhaps provided coyne and livery for president of Connacht. The east road of Athenry known as the Laragh Road, points to the strategic significance of O Daly's castle. He is listed in 1581 among the gentlemen of Connacht owning "arrearages of chief rent" to the sum of 96 pounds, 9 shillings and 1 penny.

His lands were devastated by Hugh Roe Ó Donnell in January 1597, hundreds of cattle stolen, his tenants and neighbours killed, or afterwards died of starvation. He fought under Clanricarde on the side of the English at the Battle of Kinsale in 1601.

After 1603
In the subsequent peace after the end of the war, O Daly adapted to English modes of agriculture, and attracted families with trades/skills to settle in his area. He promoted the techniques of drainage, quarrying, land cleared of scrub, and hay harvesting to reduce pastoralism in winter.

Children
 Teige of Killimor married Sisily Kelly of Gallagh and had children. They completed Killimor Castle in 1624, recorded on O Daly Marriage Stone, preserved at Killimor Church. Teige died in 1642.
 Dermot of Clonbrusk Castle, Athenry, married and left children.
 Donagh of Laragh, ancestor of the Raford and Dunsandle families
 Fergananim of Oughtercluny, Clonfert, married and had children.
 Godfrey of Newcastle, Athenry, ancestor of the Dalysgrove and Castle Daly families.

Descendants
 Denis Daly (M.P.), 1748-1791
 St George Daly (1758-1829)
 Robert Daly, D.D., 1783–1872
 James Daly, 1st Baron Dunsandle and Clanconal (1782-1847)
 Dominick Daly, 1798–1868
-

External links
 http://www.iol.ie/~mfinn/killimorcastle.html

References
 BLAKE, MARTIN J. “Families of Daly of Galway with Tabular Pedigrees.” Journal of the Galway Archaeological and Historical Society 13, no. 3/4 (1927): 140–140.
 As The Centuries Passed: A History of Kiltullagh 1500–1900, ed. Kieran Jordan, 2000
 The life and times of Dermot O'Daly, James Noel Dillon.
 The Killimor Dalys, James Noel Dillon
 The Daly Chronicle, Dermot Daly, in The Irish Genealogist, volume 11, part i, 2002, pp. 3–12.
 Clare Bards, Galway Gentry, Patrick Melvin, op. cit., pp. 13–15

People from County Galway
16th-century Irish people
17th-century Irish people
Irish landlords
17th-century Irish landowners